Captain O'Blunder or The Brave Irishman is a comedy play by the Irish actor-manager Thomas Sheridan, first performed in the early 1740s at the Smock Alley Theatre in Dublin. It depicts the adventures of a naive Irishman in London.

It is a reworking of the 1704 comedy Squire Trelooby by William Congreve and John Vanbrugh, itself based on a French farce by Molière.

List of Characters 

 Tradewell - a London merchant
 Captain O'Blunder - an Irish officer (performed by Mr Sparks)
 Lucy - daughter of Tradewell
 Betty - Lucy's maid
 Cheatwell - Lucy's lover
 Sconce
 Monsieur Ragout
 Sergeant
 Dr Clyfter - Physician
 Dr Gellypot - Physician
 Captain O'Blunder's servant

References

Bibliography
 Moody, Jane & O'Quinn, Daniel (ed.). The  Cambridge companion to British theatre, 1730-1830. Cambridge University Press, 2007.

Irish plays